Çaybaşı, formerly Çilader, is a town and district of Ordu Province in the Black Sea region of Turkey. According to the 2000 census, population of the district is 15,372 of which 4,810 live in the town of Çaybaşı.

Notes

References

External links
 District governor's official website 
 District municipality's official website 
 Road map of Çaybaşı and environs
 Various images of Çaybaşı, Ordu

Populated places in Ordu Province
Districts of Ordu Province